Loque may refer to:

 Lokve, Croatia (Italian: Loque), a municipality
 Lokev, Sežana (Italian: Loque), a settlement
 Bertrand de Loque, 16th–17th century French Protestant minister and author
 Loque, a member of the Malaysian band Butterfingers